Lawrence Walker (1907–1968) was a Cajun accordionist.

Lawrence Walker may also refer to:

Lawrence Walker (athlete), US race walker
Lawrence Walker (cricketer) (1901–1976), cricketer for Ireland
Lawrence Walker, character in Valiant Lady

See also
Larry Walker (disambiguation)
Laurie Walker (disambiguation)